Second Lives: A Journey Through Virtual Worlds is a book about virtual community, written by author Tim Guest.

Contents
Tim Guest examines life in virtual worlds. He finds some people who claim to have found love and friendship without ever having really met, he looks at companies who have used these virtual worlds to do business including IBM and the Metaverse evangelist Ian Hughes, also the developers Rivers Run Red, who have pioneered virtual worlds for brands and business use. Guest looks at the US military's virtual model to train its warriors to fight, and looks at virtual worlds in South Korea. Guest is worried about the 'dark side' of these worlds with their criminals, mafiosos, prostitutes, hackers and terrorists. This book seeks to address the question: are virtual worlds life enhancing or mere escapism. Guest in his virtual personality, 'Errol Mysterio', explores these worlds.

Bibliography 
 Tim Guest (2008) Second Lives: A Journey Through Virtual Worlds, Hutchinson

References 

Virtual world communities
 
2008 non-fiction books
Mass media about Internet culture